Dirceu José Guimarães, known as Dirceu (15 June 1952 – 15 September 1995), was a Brazilian footballer who played as an attacking midfielder, notably for Botafogo and the Brazil national team as well as numerous Italian teams in the 1980s–early 1990s.

Biography
Dirceu was born at Curitiba, in southern Brazil, on 15 June 1952.

Club career
In his early career, Dirceu played for Coritiba, Botagofo (1971–1975), Fluminense (1975–1977) and Vasco da Gama in his country, before spending one year in Mexico at América. In 1979, he signed for Spanish side Atlético Madrid, where he remained until 1982, playing 84 games and scoring 18 goals. In 1982, he signed for Italian team Hellas Verona, the first of five Italian Serie A teams which he changed yearly (the last being Avellino in 1986–1987), before returning to Vasco da Gama. In 1988 Dirceu played in the USA for Fort Lauderdale Strikers, and in 1989–1991 he played again in southern Italy, this time for Ebolitana (1989–1992) and Benevento (1991–1992). His last teams was Atlético Yucatán in Mexico, where he ended his career in 1995.

International career
Dirceu won 44 caps (14 non-official), between June 1973 and May 1986, with the Brazil national team, scoring seven goals.

He played for Brazil at the 1974, 1978, and 1982 FIFA World Cups. He was due to go to the 1986 edition of the tournament, but was ruled out by injury. He played 11 games and scored three goals in his World Cup appearances. Brazil finished fourth in 1974, while in 1978, he won the Bronze Ball and was named to the team of the tournament after helping Brazil to a third-place finish. He also took part at the 1972 Summer Olympic Games with Brazil.

Death
Dirceu died on the night of 15 September 1995, at the age of 43, when an Opel Ascona driven by a street racer ran a red light and hit his Puma at high speed in Barra da Tijuca, not too far from his apartment. Dirceu and a passenger, who was thrown out of the vehicle following the crash, died immediately. There were two couples in the Ascona; all four of them survived and nobody was prosecuted for Dirceu's death.

Legacy
The Ebolitana named its arena at Eboli the Stadio José Guimarães Dirceu in his honor.

Honours
Coritiba
Campeonato Paranaense (Paraná State championship): 1971, 1972

Fluminense
Campeonato Carioca (Rio de Janeiro State championship): 1976

Vasco da Gama
Campeonato Carioca (Rio de Janeiro State championship): 1977, 1988

Brazil
FIFA World Cup: third place 1978, fourth place 1974

Individual
1978 FIFA World Cup: All-Star Team
1978 FIFA World Cup: Bronze Ball
South American Player of the Year: Bronze award 1978

References

External links

1952 births
1995 deaths
Footballers from Curitiba
Brazilian footballers
Association football midfielders
Brazil international footballers
Olympic footballers of Brazil
Footballers at the 1972 Summer Olympics
1974 FIFA World Cup players
1978 FIFA World Cup players
1982 FIFA World Cup players
Campeonato Brasileiro Série A players
La Liga players
Serie A players
American Soccer League (1988–89) players
Liga MX players
Coritiba Foot Ball Club players
Botafogo de Futebol e Regatas players
Fluminense FC players
CR Vasco da Gama players
Club América footballers
Atlético Madrid footballers
Hellas Verona F.C. players
S.S.C. Napoli players
Ascoli Calcio 1898 F.C. players
Como 1907 players
U.S. Avellino 1912 players
Miami Freedom players
S.S. Ebolitana 1925 players
Benevento Calcio players
Road incident deaths in Brazil
Brazilian expatriate footballers
Brazilian expatriate sportspeople in Spain
Expatriate footballers in Spain
Brazilian expatriate sportspeople in Italy
Expatriate footballers in Italy
Brazilian expatriate sportspeople in the United States
Expatriate soccer players in the United States
Brazilian expatriate sportspeople in Mexico
Expatriate footballers in Mexico